Ian Edmond (born 2 June 1978) is a former competitive swimmer and breaststroke specialist who represented Great Britain in the Olympics, FINA world championships, and European championships, and competed for Scotland in the Commonwealth Games.

In his junior years he swam for Reading SC in England, and joined Warrender BC as his Scottish club team.  In 1996 he relocated to Edinburgh for University and swam with Warrender and the City of Edinburgh Swim Team under coach Tim Jones.

Edmond was the silver medallist at the 2003 World Aquatics Championships in the 200 m breaststroke. In the same year he was champion in the same event at the European SC Championships.

At the 2004 Olympic Games in Athens he represented Great Britain in the men's 200-metre breaststroke where he reached the semi-final, but was disqualified during his swim. He also represented Scotland at the 1998 and 2002 Commonwealth Games.

See also
List of British records in swimming

External links
British Swimming athlete profile

1978 births
Living people
Sportspeople from Reading, Berkshire
Scottish male swimmers
Male breaststroke swimmers
Olympic swimmers of Great Britain
Swimmers at the 2004 Summer Olympics
Commonwealth Games competitors for Scotland
Swimmers at the 1998 Commonwealth Games
Swimmers at the 2002 Commonwealth Games
World Aquatics Championships medalists in swimming